Ekenäs is a village in Kalmar Municipality, Sweden, situated on Kalmar Sound east of European route E22. It is the site of two traditional shipyards and a small yacht harbour.

Populated places in Kalmar County